Yazdegerd III (also spelled Yazdgerd III and Yazdgird III) was the last Sasanian King of Kings of Iran from 632 to 651. His father was Shahriyar and his grandfather was Khosrow II.

Ascending the throne at the age of eight, the young shah lacked authority and reigned as figurehead, whilst real power was in the hands of the army commanders, courtiers, and powerful members of the aristocracy, who engaged in internecine warfare. The Sasanian Empire was weakened severely by these internal conflicts, resulting in invasions by the Göktürks from the east, and Khazars from the west. It was, however, the Arabs, united under the banner of Islam, who dealt the decisive blow. Yazdegerd was unable to contain the Arab invasion of Iran, and spent most of his reign fleeing from one province to another in the vain hope of raising an army. Yazdegerd met his end at the hands of a miller near Marw in 651, bringing an end to the last pre-Islamic Iranian empire after more than 400 years of rule.

Etymology 
The name of Yazdegerd is a combination of the Old Iranian yazad yazata- "divine being" and -karta "made", and thus stands for "God-made", comparable to Iranian Bagkart and Greek Theoktistos. The name of Yazdegerd is known in other languages as; Pahlavi Yazdekert; New Persian Yazd(e)gerd; Syriac Yazdegerd, Izdegerd, and Yazdeger; Armenian Yazkert; Talmudic Izdeger and Azger; Arabic Yazdeijerd; Greek Isdigerdes.

Background 
Yazdegerd was the son of prince Shahriyar and the grandson of the last prominent shah of Iran, Khosrow II, who was in 628 overthrown and executed by his own son Kavad II, who proceeded to have all his brothers and half-brothers executed, including Shahriyar. This dealt a heavy blow to the empire, which it would never recover from. Furthermore, the fall of Khosrow II also culminated in a civil war lasting four years, with the most powerful members of the nobility gaining full autonomy and starting to create their own government. The hostilities between the Persian (Parsig) and Parthian (Pahlav) noble-families were also resumed, which split up the wealth of the nation. A few months later, a devastating plague swept through the western Sasanian provinces, killing half of its population including Kavad II.

He was succeeded by his eight-year-old son Ardashir III, who was killed two years later by the distinguished Sasanian general Shahrbaraz, who was in turn murdered forty days later in a coup by the Pahlav leader Farrukh Hormizd, who installed the daughter of Khosrow II, Boran, on the throne. She was deposed a year later, and a succession of rulers followed one another, until Boran was sovereign once more in 631, only to be killed the following year, seemingly by the Parsig leader Piruz Khosrow. The most powerful magnates in the empire, Rostam Farrokhzad and Piruz Khosrow, now threatened by their own men, eventually agreed to work together, and installed Yazdegerd III on the throne, thus putting an end to the civil war. He was crowned in the Anahid fire-temple in Istakhr, where he had been hiding during the civil war. The temple was the very place where the first Sasanian shah Ardashir I had crowned himself, indicating that the reason behind Yazdegerd's coronation at the same place was due to hopes for a rejuvenation of the empire. He was almost the last living member of the House of Sasan. Most scholars agree that Yazdegerd was eight years old at his coronation.

Reign

Conditions of the empire

Yazdegerd, however, did not have the authority required to bring stability to his extensive empire, which was swiftly falling apart due to ceaseless internal conflicts between the army commanders, courtiers, and powerful members of the aristocracy, who were fighting amongst themselves and wiping each other out. Many of the governors of the empire had proclaimed independence and carved out their own kingdom. The governors of the provinces of Mazun and Yemen had already asserted their independence during the civil war of 628–632, thus resulting in the disintegration of Sasanian rule in the Arabian peninsula, which was uniting under the banner of Islam. The Iranologist Khodadad Rezakhani argues that the Sasanians had most likely lost much of their possessions after Khosrow II's execution in 628.

The empire was starting to look more like the Parthian feudal system before the fall of the Arsacid Empire. Yazdegerd, although being acknowledged as the rightful monarch by both the Parsig and Pahlav factions, does not seem to have held sway over all of his empire. Indeed, during the first years of his rule coins were only minted in Pars, Sakastan, and Khuzestan, approximately corresponding to the regions of the southwest (Xwarwarān) and southeast (Nēmrōz), where the Parsig was based. The Pahlav, who were mainly based in the northern portion of the empire, refused to mint coins of him. Even in the south Yazdegerd's rule was not seemingly secure; a Sasanian claimant to the throne, Khosrow IV, minted coins at Susa in Khuzestan around this time, which he would do till 636. According to Rezakhani, Yazdegerd seemingly did not control Mesopotamia, including the capital of Ctesiphon. He argues that the conspiring aristocrats and the population of Ctesiphon, "do not appear to have been too successful or eager in bringing Yazdgerd to the capital."

The empire was also at the same time invaded on all fronts; by the Göktürks in the east, and by Khazars in the west, who raided Armenia and Adurbadagan. The Sasanian army had been heavily weakened due to the war with the Byzantines and internal conflict. The circumstances were so chaotic, and the condition of the nation so alarming, that "the Persians openly spoke of the imminent downfall of their empire, and saw its portents in natural calamities."

Early clash with the Muslim Arabs

In May 633, the Muslims defeated a Sasanian force under Azadbeh near the important strategic Sasanian city of Hira, which was shortly afterwards occupied. After the fall of Hira, Yazdegerd began to pay greater attention to the Muslims; Rostam Farrokhzad sent an army under the Persian military officer Bahman Jadhuyih and the Armenian military officer Jalinus against the Muslims. Rostam is known to have told Bahman secretly that: "if Jalinus returns to the like of his defeat, then cut off his head." The Sasanian army managed to defeat the Muslims at the Battle of the Bridge.

In 636, Yazdegerd III ordered Rostam Farrokhzad to subdue the invading Arabs and then told him: "Today you are the [most prominent] man among the Iranians. You see that the people of Iran have not faced a situation like this since the family of Ardashir I assumed power." Envoys then came to Yazdegerd III asking him to consider the dismissal of Rostam in order to replace him with someone around whom the people would rally.

Yazdegerd III asked Rostam for an assessment of the Arab forces since they had camped at Qadisiyyah. Rostam Farrokhzad stated that the Arabs were "a pack of wolves, falling upon unsuspecting shepherds and annihilating them." Yazdegerd III responds to Rostam by saying,

Last stand 

However, the Sasanian army suffered a crushing defeat at the Battle of al-Qadisiyyah, with Rostam, Bahman, Jalinus and two Armenian princes named Grigor II Novirak and Mushegh III Mamikonian being killed during the battle. The Arabs then marched towards the Sasanian capital of Ctesiphon without meeting any resistance. Yazdegerd took his treasury, and along with 1,000 of his servants fled to Hulwan in Media, leaving Rostam Farrokhzad's brother Farrukhzad in charge of Ctesiphon. Farrukhzad, however, did not attempt any resistance and also went to Hulwan. The Arabs subsequently reached Ctesiphon, besieged the western parts of the city, and soon occupied all of it. The Iranian defeat at the Battle of al-Qadisiyyah has often been described as a turning point in the Arab invasion of Iran. However, in reality, it was far from it. The battle served as a wake-up call for the Iranian armies, who became conscious that persistent factionalism could result in their inevitable destruction. Al-Tabari emphasizes this, stating that after the fall of Ctesiphon "the people... were about to go their separate ways, they started to incite one another: 'If you disperse now, you will never get together again; this is a spot that sends us in different directions'."

In April 637, the Arabs defeated another Sasanian army at the Battle of Jalula. After this defeat, Yazdegerd fled deeper into Media. He subsequently raised a new army and send it to Nahavand to retake Ctesiphon and prevent any further Muslim advances. The army that Yazdegerd sent seemed such a serious threat that it led Umar to combine the Arab forces of Kufa and Basra under Al-Nu'man ibn Muqrin and send them against the Sasanians with reinforcements from Syria and Oman. The battle is said to have lasted several days. It resulted in major losses on both sides, including the death of al-Nu'man ibn Muqrin and the Iranian generals Mardanshah and Piruz Khosrow. The Battle of Nahavand in 642 was the second military disaster for the Sasanians after the Battle of al-Qadisiyyah.

Flight

After the Sasanian disaster, Yazdegerd fled to Isfahan, and raised a small army under a certain military officer named Siyah, who had lost his property to the Arabs. However, Siyah and the rest of the army mutinied against Yazdegerd, and agreed to help the Arabs in return for places to live. Meanwhile, Yazdegerd had arrived in Estakhr, where he tried organizing a base for resistance in the province of Pars. However, in 650, Abdullah ibn Aamir, the governor of Basra, invaded Pars and put an end to the Persian resistance. Estakhr was made into ruins after the battle and a force of 40,000 defenders including many Persian nobles were killed. After the Arab conquest of Pars, Yazdegerd fled to Kirman while being pursued by an Arab force. Yazdegerd managed to flee from the Arab force in a snowstorm at Bimand.

After arriving at Kirman, Yazdegerd became unfriendly with the marzban (general of a frontier province, "margrave") of Kirman, and then left Kirman for Sakastan. Another Basran army later arrived which defeated and killed the marzban of Kirman in a bloody fight. When Yazdegerd arrived at Sakastan he lost the support of the governor of Sakastan by demanding tax from him. Yazdegerd then headed for Merv to join the leader of the Turks. However, when he arrived in Khorasan the inhabitants did not agree with Yazdegerd's decision to continue waging war and told him that it was better if he made peace with the Arabs; Yazdegerd, however, refused. Sakastan was later taken by the Arab forces after a bloody fight around 650–652. Yazdegerd was also supported by the Principality of Chaghaniyan, which sent him troops to aid him against the Arabs. When Yazdegerd arrived in Marw (in what is today's Turkmenistan) he demanded tax from the marzban of Marw, losing also his support and making him ally with Nezak Tarkan, the Hephthalite ruler of Badghis, who helped him defeat Yazdegerd and his followers.

Chinese assistance

After Yazdegerd III started to suffer from the onslaught of the Muslim Arabs, he soon sent an envoy to the Chinese court in 639 "for offering tribute”. As he continued to suffer defeats from the Arabs, he again sent envoys to China, in 647 and 648, in order to “seek assistance from the Chinese court with the hope to form a new army". Some form of help would only arrive in 661, after Peroz III, the son of Yazdegerd, again sent envoys in 654 and 661. The Chinese established a "Persian military commandery" (波斯都督府) in the city of Zābol (疾陵城 Jilingcheng) in Tokharistan, and Peroz was appointed as Military Commander (都督 Dudu). Only in 679 would a Chinese army accompany Narsieh, the exiled son of Peroz, in order to restore him to the Sasanian throne, but the army stopped in Tokharistan and instead repelled the invasion of Western Turkic Khan Ashina Duzhi, leaving Narsieh to fight against the Muslim Arabs for the next twenty years.

Death, legacy and personality
After his defeat, Yazdegerd sought refuge at a miller near Marw, who, however, murdered him in 651. According to Kia, the miller had reportedly killed Yazdegerd in order to obtain his jewelry, whilst the Cambridge History of Iran states that the miller was sent by Mahoe Suri. Regardless, the death of Yazdegerd marked the end of the Sasanian Empire, and made it less difficult for the Arabs to conquer the rest of Iran. All of Khorasan was soon conquered by the Arabs, who would use it as a base to attack Transoxiana. The death of Yazdegerd thus marked the end of the last pre-Islamic Iranian empire after more than 400 years of rule. An empire–which had a generation earlier briefly conquered Egypt and Asia Minor, even reaching as a far as Constantinople, fell to a force of lightly equipped Arabs that were used to skirmishes and desert warfare. The heavy Sasanian cavalry was too sluggish and systematized to contain them; employing light-armed Arab or East Iranian mercenaries from Khorasan and Transoxiana would have been much more successful.

Yazdegerd was according to tradition buried by Christian monks in a tall tomb that was situated in a garden decorated with silk and musk. His funeral and the construction of a mausoleum for his body near Merv was organized by the Nestorian bishop Elijah - in memory of the fact that the Shahanshah's grandmother Shirin was a Christian. Mahoe, for his part in the murder of the Sassanian king, had his arms, legs, ears and nose cut off by the Turks, who eventually left him die under the scorching summer sun. The corpse of Mahoe was then burned at the stake, along with the bodies of his three sons.

The monks cursed Mahoe and made a hymn to Yazdegerd, mourning the fall of a "combative" king and the "house of Ardashir I." Whether this event was factual or not, it emphasizes that the Christians of the empire remained loyal to the Zoroastrian Sasanians, even possibly more than the Iranian nobles who had deserted Yazdegerd. Indeed, there were close links between the late Sasanian rulers and Christians, whose conditions had greatly improved compared to that of the early Sasanian era. Yazdegerd's wife was according to folklore a Christian, whilst his son and heir, Peroz III was seemingly an adherent of Christianity, and even had a church built in Tang China, where he had taken refuge. Yazdegerd became remembered in history as a martyred prince; many rulers and officers would later claim being a descendant of him in Islamic Iran.

Yazdegerd was well educated and cultured, but his arrogance, pride and inability to compare his demands with the real situation led to him constantly falling out with his governors and his influence diminishing as he, pursued by Arabs, moved from one city to another. At each new place, he behaved as if he was still the all-powerful monarch of the kingdom, and not an outcast running away from enemies, which, combined with his military failures, turned many of his most loyal subjects away from him.

Zoroastrian calendar
The Zoroastrian religious calendar, which is still in use today, uses the regnal year of Yazdegerd III as its base year, and its calendar era (year numbering system) is accompanied by a Y.Z. suffix.

Magians took Yazdegerd III's death as the end of the millennium of Zoroaster and the beginning of the millennium of Oshedar.

See also
 Death of Yazdgerd (play)
 Death of Yazdgerd (film)

Notes

References

Sources 
 
 
 
 
 
 
 
 
 
 
 
 
 
 
 
 
 

Medieval child monarchs
624 births
651 deaths
7th-century Sasanian monarchs
People of the Muslim conquest of Persia
Murdered Persian monarchs
Shahnameh characters